Marius Poškus (born 7 July 1970) is a retired Lithuanian international football goalkeeper. He obtained a total number of sixteen caps for the Lithuania national football team. During his professional career he played for several clubs in his native country, including FK Sirijus Klaipėda and FK Inkaras Kaunas .

Honours
 Baltic Cup
 1991
 1992

References
 

1970 births
Living people
Lithuanian footballers
Lithuania international footballers
Association football goalkeepers
FK Sirijus Klaipėda players
FK Inkaras Kaunas players